Ventifact Knobs are minor knobs, 3 to 6 m high, composed of lake clay covered by glacial drift. The glacial drift has cobbles that are well polished by the wind and cut into ventifacts. The knobs are covered by ventifacts, suggesting the name, and are located just east of Lake Bonney in Taylor Valley, Victoria Land, Antarctica. They were named by American geologist Troy L. Pewe, who was first to study and describe the knobs in December 1957.

Rock formations of Victoria Land
McMurdo Dry Valleys